Elgol is a village on the shores of Loch Scavaig towards the end of the Strathaird peninsula in the Isle of Skye, in the Scottish Highlands.

Name
According to tradition, its name derives from a battle fought with five ships by Aella, a follower of Vortigern, against the Picts and Scots ("Aella-gol").

History
The Strathaird peninsula was historically a heartland of the MacKinnons, a robustly Jacobite clan. On 4 July 1746, the Young Pretender found sanctuary at Elgol in the course of his wanderings under the protection of MacKinnon of MacKinnon and Captain John MacKinnon of Elgol. The cave where he is said to have waited for a boat to the mainland ("Prince Charlie’s cave", or "Uamh Phrionnsa") can still be visited today, a short walk to the south of the village.

Gallery

Present day
The village had a considerably higher population prior to the Clearances. It now has a population of approximately 150. Elgol's scenic attractions have drawn in many outsiders seeking holiday homes and a majority of the properties there are no longer occupied on a year-round basis. In the 2011 census, 31% of the residents were reported as speaking Gaelic.

The village is also a terminal for two privately owned boat trips to Loch Coruisk and the Small Isles along with a coffee shop, Bistro and a Michelin Guide restaurant.

References

External links

Undiscovered Scotland - Elgol

Populated places in the Isle of Skye